Totiviridae is a family of double-stranded RNA viruses. Giardia lamblia, leishmania, trichomonas vaginalis, and fungi serve as natural hosts. The name of the group derives from Latin toti which means undivided or whole. There are 28 species in this family, assigned to 5 genera.

Structure
Viruses in the family Totiviridae are non-enveloped, double-stranded RNA viruses with icosahedral geometries, and T=2 symmetry. The virion consists of a single capsid protein and is about 40 nanometers in diameter.

Genome 

The genome is composed of a monopartite, linear double-stranded RNA molecule of 4.6–6.7 kilobases. It contains two overlapping open reading frames (ORF) – gag and pol – which respectively encode the capsid protein and the RNA-dependent RNA polymerase. Some totiviruses contain a third small potential ORF.

Life cycle

Viral replication is cytoplasmic. Replication follows the double-stranded RNA virus replication model. Double-stranded RNA virus transcription is the method of transcription. Translation takes place by -1 ribosomal frameshifting, +1 ribosomal frameshifting, viral initiation, and  RNA termination-reinitiation. The virus exits the host cell by cell-to-cell movement. Giardia lamblia protozoa, leishmania protozoa, protozoan trichomonas vaginalis, and fungi serve as the natural host.

Taxonomy 
The family Totiviridae has five genera:
 Giardiavirus
 Leishmaniavirus
 Totivirus
 Trichomonasvirus
 Victorivirus

Examples
An example of fungal totivirus is the L-A helper virus, a cytoplasmic virus found primarily in Saccharomyces cerevisiae.

References

External links
 Viralzone: Totiviridae
 ICTV

 
Virus families
Riboviria